Christoph Wiederkehr (born 12 April 1990) is an Austrian politician of NEOS – The New Austria. Since November 2020, he has served as Vice Mayor of Vienna and City Councillor for Education. He is leader of the Viennese branch of NEOS, and was previously leader of the party's parliamentary group in the Gemeinderat and Landtag of Vienna since September 2018.

Personal life
Wiederkehr passed the Matura at the College Borromaeum Salzburg in 2009. He then went to Vienna, where he began studying political science at the University of Vienna. He spent semesters abroad attending the University of Sussex and the Australian National University. In Australia, he was an intern at the Austrian Embassy in Canberra from October to December 2012. In 2013 he obtained his Bachelor's degree and later a Master of Arts. He has worked at the Constitutional Court since 2013.

Political career
Wiederkehr was chairman of the NEOS student association from September 2013 to June 2015. Since November 2015 he has been chairman of the youth organization JUNOS.

Wiederkehr was one of five NEOS deputies elected to the Gemeinderat and Landtag of Vienna in the 2015 Viennese state election. In September 2018, he succeeded Beate Meinl-Reisinger as the parliamentary leader of NEOS in Vienna. In December, he was elected state party spokesman.

In December 2019, Wiederkehr was announced as NEOS's lead candidate for the 2020 Viennese state election. The party won 7.5% of votes and eight seats in the election, an improvement from its 2015 result. Wiederkehr successfully brought NEOS into negotiations with the ruling Social Democratic Party afterwards, who agreed to a coalition government. This marks the first time NEOS has cooperated with the SPÖ on the state level. Wiederkehr was sworn in as Vice Mayor of Vienna and City Councillor for Education on 24 November.

In June 2021, Wiederkehr was elected as federal deputy leader of NEOS, alongside Andrea Klambauer.

References

1990 births
Living people
NEOS – The New Austria politicians
Politicians from Salzburg
21st-century Austrian politicians